The Deputy Chief Minister of Karnataka is a member of the Cabinet in the Government of Karnataka. Not technically a constitutional office, it seldom carries any specific powers. A deputy Chief minister usually also holds a key cabinet portfolio such as home minister or finance minister. In the parliamentary system of government, According to the Constitution of India, the Governor is Karnataka's de jure head, but de facto executive authority rests with its Chief Minister; the position of Deputy Chief Minister is used to bring political stability and strength within a coalition government or in times of Hung Parliament, when a proper chain of command is necessary

The first Deputy Chief Minister of Karnataka was S. M. Krishna, in M. Veerappa Moily's cabinet in 1992. The office has since been only intermittently occupied. The former Chief Minister Siddaramaiah is the Longest serving Deputy Chief Minister of Karnataka, who held the Post on Two Occasions. Once during the Chief Minister-ship of J. H. Patel and another time when Dharam Singh was the Chief Minister. R. Ashoka and Eshwarappa were Deputy Chief Minister of Karnataka, who took on the role when Jagadish Shettar was the Chief Minister. When H. D. Kumaraswamy formed Government in 2018, 
G. Parameshwara was sworn-in as the Deputy Chief Minister.  After which when B.S. Yeddyurappa formed Government in 2019, three Deputy Chief Ministers were sworn-in,  C. N. Ashwath Narayan, Govind Karjol and Laxman Savadi. For the first Karnataka witnessed 3 Deputy Chief Ministers in office at the same time.

Many times there arose a proposal to make this post permanent, but nothing happened.

So far, Karnataka has witnessed 11 Deputy Chief Ministers in 9 Terms; meanwhile, Siddaramaiah held the position twice.

List of Deputy Chief Ministers of Karnataka

See also
 List of Chief Ministers of Karnataka
 Deputy Prime Minister of India

References

Deputy Chief Ministers of Karnataka
State cabinet ministers of Karnataka
Karnataka
Political office-holders in Karnataka
Chief Ministers of Karnataka
deputy chief ministers of Karnataka
Karnataka politics-related lists